Dragomiris is a genus of beetles in the family Cerambycidae, containing the following species:

 Dragomiris major Martins & Monné, 1980
 Dragomiris quadricornutus Gounelle, 1913

References

Torneutini